Puerto de San Vicente is a municipality located at the western end of the province of Toledo, Castile-La Mancha, Spain. According to the 2014 census, the municipality has a population of 202 inhabitants.

Buildings

See also
La Jara (comarca)

References

External links

Municipalities in the Province of Toledo